The men's coxless four competition at the 2013 Summer Universiade in Kazan took place the Kazan Rowing Centre.

Results

Heats

Heat 1

Heat 2

Repechage

Finals

Final A

References 

Rowing at the 2013 Summer Universiade